The 1998–99 NBA season was the Pistons' 51st season in the National Basketball Association, and 42nd season in the city of Detroit. On March 23, 1998, the owners of all 29 NBA teams voted 27–2 to reopen the league's collective bargaining agreement, seeking changes to the league's salary cap system, and a ceiling on individual player salaries. The National Basketball Players Association (NBPA) opposed to the owners' plan, and wanted raises for players who earned the league's minimum salary. After both sides failed to reach an agreement, the owners called for a lockout, which began on July 1, 1998, putting a hold on all team trades, free agent signings and training camp workouts, and cancelling many NBA regular season and preseason games. Due to the lockout, the NBA All-Star Game, which was scheduled to be played in Philadelphia on February 14, 1999, was also cancelled. However, on January 6, 1999, NBA commissioner David Stern, and NBPA director Billy Hunter finally reached an agreement to end the lockout. The deal was approved by both the players and owners, and was signed on January 20, ending the lockout after 204 days. The regular season began on February 5, and was cut short to just 50 games instead of the regular 82-game schedule.

In the off-season, the Pistons acquired Christian Laettner from the Atlanta Hawks, and signed free agents Loy Vaught, and Jud Buechler. Laettner would reunite with former Duke University teammate Grant Hill, but only played just 16 games due to an Achilles injury and a broken rib. After a solid year the previous season, Brian Williams changed his named to Bison Dele to honor his Cherokee heritage. The Pistons won their first three games, but then lost five straight. However, they would play above .500 for the rest of the season, and bounce back from their disappointing season to finish third in the Central Division with a 29–21 record, and return to the playoffs after a one-year absence.

Hill averaged 21.1 points, 7.1 rebounds, 6.0 assists and 1.6 steals per game, was named to the All-NBA Second Team, and finished in eighth place in Most Valuable Player voting, while sixth man Jerry Stackhouse continued to provide scoring off the bench averaging 14.5 points per game. In addition, Lindsey Hunter provided the team with 11.9 points and 1.8 steals per game, while Joe Dumars contributed 11.3 points per game, and Dele averaged 10.5 points and 5.6 rebounds per game. Off the bench, Laettner averaged 7.6 points and 3.4 rebounds per game, while Jerome Williams provided the team with 7.0 points and 7.1 rebounds per game, and starting power forward Don Reid contributed 5.1 points and 3.6 rebounds per game.

However, in the Eastern Conference First Round of the playoffs, the Pistons would lose to the Atlanta Hawks in five games. This season also marked an end of an era, as Dumars retired after a solid fourteen-year career with the Pistons, and would become the team's vice president next season. This was also Dele's final season of his career as he retired before the following season, turning down a $36 million contract.

Draft picks

Roster

Regular season

Season standings

c - clinched homecourt advantage
y - clinched division title
x - clinched playoff spot

Record vs. opponents

Game log

Playoffs

|- align="center" bgcolor="#ffcccc"
| 1
| May 8
| @ Atlanta
| L 70–90
| Grant Hill (26)
| Bison Dele (9)
| Grant Hill (8)
| Georgia Dome20,884
| 0–1
|- align="center" bgcolor="#ffcccc"
| 2
| May 10
| @ Atlanta
| L 69–89
| Grant Hill (15)
| Grant Hill (10)
| Joe Dumars (5)
| Georgia Dome16,377
| 0–2
|- align="center" bgcolor="#ccffcc"
| 3
| May 12
| Atlanta
| W 79–63
| Christian Laettner (15)
| Jerome Williams (10)
| Grant Hill (5)
| The Palace of Auburn Hills14,812
| 1–2
|- align="center" bgcolor="#ccffcc"
| 4
| May 14
| Atlanta
| W 103–82
| Grant Hill (23)
| Jerome Williams (8)
| Grant Hill (9)
| The Palace of Auburn Hills16,216
| 2–2
|- align="center" bgcolor="#ffcccc"
| 5
| May 16
| @ Atlanta
| L 75–87
| Grant Hill (21)
| Dele, Hill (7)
| Grant Hill (11)
| Alexander Memorial Coliseum8,460
| 2–3
|-

Player statistics

Regular season

Playoffs

Player Statistics Citation:

Awards and records
Grant Hill, All-NBA Second Team

Transactions

References

See also
1998-99 NBA season

Detroit Pistons seasons
Detroit
Detroit
Detroit